= 1920 Gotha state election =

German state election

The 1920 Gotha state election was held on 30 May 1920 to elect the 19 members of the Landtag of Gotha.

== Results ==
Party	Votes	%	Seats	+/–
Independent Social Democratic Party of Germany	39,102	43.47	9	–1
Bauernbund	21,526	23.93	5	+4
German People's Party	13,138	14.61	3	New
German Democratic Party	7,865	8.74	1	–3
German National People's Party	4,181	4.65	1	New
Social Democratic Party of Germany	4,139	4.60	0	–1
Total	89,951	100.00	19	0
Registered voters/turnout	114,788	–		
Source: Elections in the Weimar Republic,
